The 2016–17 Gibraltar Women's Football League is the first season of 11-a-side women's football in Gibraltar since the territory joined UEFA in 2013, and FIFA in 2016. The league had been in operation for a number of years previously, but teams were ineligible for entry to the UEFA Women's Champions League as it was only a 9-a-side tournament. Manchester 62 were the reigning champions.

Lincoln Red Imps won the title. They did not enter the 2017–18 UEFA Women's Champions League though.

Teams
Glacis United stopped participating after the 2015–16 season.

Europa Ladies
Lincoln Ladies
Lions Gibraltar Ladies
Manchester 62 Ladies

League table
Manchester 62 apparently withdrew mid-season.

References

External links
Association website

2016–17 domestic women's association football leagues
Football leagues in Gibraltar